Below is a list of notable footballers who have played for Leeds United. Generally, this means players that have played 100 or more first-class matches for the club. However, some players who have played fewer matches are also included, as are the club's founder members and some players who fell just short of the 100 total but made significant contributions to the club's history (e.g. Don Revie).

Players are listed according to the date of their first professional contract signed with the club. Appearances and goals are for first-team competitive matches only; wartime matches are excluded. Substitute appearances are also included.

Notable players
Correct as of 24  May 2021 counting Leeds United first team games in either League, Cup or play-off games.
Criteria for including players is 100+ games or being a particularly high profile player (e.g. Tony Yeboah)

Key to positions

Leeds United's 100 greatest players
The following list was compiled in 2004 by Leeds United.

Players in bold attained international caps

Greatest ever team

The following team was voted the greatest ever Leeds United team by supporters and announced on 10 April 2006 on the Leeds United website. A formal dinner also took place to reward all the players voted into the team.

 Nigel Martyn (1996–2003)
 Paul Reaney (1962–1978)
 Norman Hunter (1962–1976)
 Jack Charlton (1952–1973)
 Terry Cooper (1963–1974)
 Peter Lorimer (1962–1979, 1983–1985)
 Billy Bremner (1959–1976)
 Johnny Giles (1963–1975)
 Eddie Gray (1965–1983)
 Allan Clarke  (1969–1977)
 John Charles (1948–1957, 1962)

There is an alternative version here voted for by fans visiting fan sites.

Player of the YearPlayers in bold won the Player of the Year award on more than one occasionGoal of the Season

 2000: Harry Kewell (vs Sheffield Wednesday, Apr 2000)
 2001: –
 2002: Mark Viduka (vs Newcastle United, Dec 2001)
 2003: –
 2004: –
 2005: David Healy (vs Plymouth Argyle, Dec 2004)
 2006: Eddie Lewis (vs Colchester United, Apr 2007)
 2007: –
 2008: Jermaine Beckford (vs Hartlepool United, Sep 2007)
 2009: Fabian Delph (vs Brighton, Jan 2009)
 2010: Jermaine Beckford (vs Manchester United, Jan 2010)
 2011: Bradley Johnson (vs Arsenal, Jan 2011)
 2012: Adam Clayton (vs Leicester City, Nov 2011)
 2013: Ross McCormack (vs Tottenham Hotspur, Jan 2013)
 2014: Ross McCormack (vs Sheffield Wednesday, Aug 2013)
 2015: Rodolph Austin (vs Watford, Feb 2015)
 2016: Lewis Cook (vs Fulham, Feb 2016)
 2017: Souleymane Doukara (vs Nottingham Forest, Jan 2017)
 2018: Ezgjan Alioski (vs Nottingham Forest, Aug 2017)
 2019: Mateusz Klich (vs Sheffield Wednesday, Sep 2018)
 2020: Luke Ayling (vs Huddersfield Town, Mar 2020)
 2021: Stuart Dallas (2nd goal vs Manchester City, Apr 2021)

Most Memorable Moment Award
 2000: Nigel Martyn (for his performance against Roma in the UEFA Cup)

Lifetime Achievement Award
 2005: Lucas Radebe
 2018: Peter Lorimer

Best Contribution to the Community Award

 2005: Lucas Radebe
 2006: –
 2007: –
 2008: Casper Ankergren
 2009: Andrew Hughes
 2010: Leigh Bromby, Jonny Howson and Ben Parker
 2011: Jonny Howson
 2012: Aidan White
 2013: Leigh Bromby
 2014: Matt Smith

Unsung Hero Award/Bobby Collins Award
Known 2008-13 as Chairman's Special Award, chosen by Ken Bates. Known as Unsung Hero Award from 2015.

 2008: Andrew Hughes
 2009: Jonathan Douglas and Ben Parker
 2010: Ben Parker
 2011: Harvey Sharman (Head Physiotherapist) 2012: Neil Redfearn (Caretaker Manager/Reserve Team Manager) 2013: Tom Lees
 2014: –
 2015: Shaun Ford (Academy Kit Man) 2016: Mandy Ward (Ticket Office Manager) 2017: Mark Broadley (Head of I.T. and Facilities) 2018: Stix Lockwood (Player Liaison) 2019: Adam Underwood (Academy Manager) 2020: Olivia Smart (Leeds United Women player) 2021: Rob Price (Head of Medicine and Performance)''

Bremner Square XI
The following team was voted by the fans as 11 Legendary players (including Billy Bremner. They were voted to each have a stone engraved around the Billy Bremner statue outside Elland Road. They were described as '10 legend stones' in the area around the famous statue. Each stone will be engraved with the legends’ key stats and achievements during their careers with Leeds United.
  Billy Bremner
  John Charles
  Jack Charlton
  Allan Clarke
  Johnny Giles
  Eddie Gray
  Norman Hunter
  Peter Lorimer
  Lucas Radebe
  Gary Speed
  Gordon Strachan

Captains

References

Players
 
Leeds United AFC
Association football player non-biographical articles